Banka Banka Station is a location in the Northern Territory of Australia, 100 kilometres north of Tennant Creek along the Stuart Highway. The historic cattle station was the first operational pastoral lease in this region, and a supply camp during World War II, providing meat, eggs, fruits and vegetables. It was occupied and run by the Ward family and is still the site of a mudbrick homestead.

Historical significance

Ward family
Philip and Mary Alice Ward bought Banka Banka Station in 1941. Mary supervised the development of an extensive garden at the station. The homestead was a regular stopping place for travellers. In 1945, Philip Ward was among the first to truck cattle by road. After her husband's death in 1959, Mary ran the station. Due to her efforts, a government school for Aborigines openened at Banka Banka in 1961. She was known as "The Missus of Banka Banka." In 1970, suffering ill health, she sold Banka Banka and moved to Adelaide, where she died two years later.

Mudbrick homestead
The Banka Banka mudbrick homestead is a single story, rectangular building with a pitched roof consisting of a timber roof frame and corrugated metal roof sheeting, mudbrick walls, concrete floors, surrounded by a veranda supported by concrete posts. The building consists of three rooms. The homestead, which was partly reconstructed in 2001, is of architectural interest for its extensive use of mudbrick. It represents an unusual construction material and technique for pastoral homesteads of this era.

Modern Amenities
Banka Banka Station operates as a campground. There is a scenic walk through native flora to a bush watering hole. A licensed bar is available in the historic mud homestead.

See also
List of ranches and stations
 List of reduplicated Australian place names

References

 Ward, Mary Alice (1896 - 1972) (Australian Dictionary of Biography)
 Banka Banka Mudbrick Homestead
 

Pastoral leases in the Northern Territory
Stations (Australian agriculture)